Lucas Raúl Giovini Schiapino (born 13 October 1981) is an Argentine-born Chilean footballer that currently plays for the club Magallanes as a goalkeeper.

In 2014 Giovini gained Chilean nationality.

Honours

Club
Villa Dalminé
 Primera C (1): 2001–02

Colegiales
 Primera C (1): 2007–08

Unión San Felipe
 Primera B de Chile (1): 2009
 Primera B de Chile (1): 2009 Apertura
 Copa Chile (1): 2009

Unión La Calera
 Primera B de Chile (1): 2017 Transición

References

External links
 
 Lucas Giovini at Football-Lineups
 

1981 births
Living people
Argentine footballers
Argentine expatriate footballers
Primera B de Chile players
Unión San Felipe footballers
Chilean Primera División players
Unión La Calera footballers
Expatriate footballers in Chile
Association football goalkeepers
Chilean footballers
Naturalized citizens of Chile